The 2018 Louisville mayoral election was the fifth quadrennial Louisville Metro mayoral election, held on Tuesday, November 6, 2018.  The Democratic ticket of incumbent mayor and businessman Greg Fischer was elected to his third and final term.  He defeated the Republican ticket of engineer and former Louisville Metro Councilwoman Angela Leet.     

As the incumbent mayor, Fischer secured his party's nomination with little resistance.  Despite the presence of five total candidates on the Democratic primary ballot, Fischer won the primary with a resounding 75% of the vote.  The Republicans experienced a slightly more competitive primary,  despite having only two candidates total.  Leet clinched her party's nomination in May, defeating Bob DeVore, the Republican nominee for Mayor of Louisville in 2014.  

Fischer and Leet were challenged in the General election ballot by a total of seven nonpartisan and independent candidates.  Nine total candidates appeared on the 2018 General Election ballot.  Despite having participated in previous mayoral elections and having a presence in Louisville, the Green and Libertarian parties did not field candidates in the 2018 race.

The campaigns focused heavily on local issues, with both candidates having centered their campaigns on completely different issues.  Fischer campaigned on a  record he described as one of "unprecedented growth" — specifically citing over 2,700 new businesses and $13 billion in capital investment.  In contrast, Leet focused heavily on crime, specifically the sharp increase in Louisville's homicide rate, over the course of Fischer's tenure.  The campaign was marked by record levels of fundraising, with over $2 million being raised from both sides.  The Fischer campaign raised approximately $1.6 million, which stands in stark contrast to the Leet campaign, who only managed to raise $458,400 total, with about $200,000 coming out of her own pocket for the general election.

Fischer defeated Leet, winning an overwhelming majority of the popular vote.  Fischer won 61.3% of the popular vote compared to Leet's 36.5%.  Despite receiving approximately five thousand more votes than in the 2014 Louisville mayoral election, Fischer's overall percentage of votes received was lower than in 2014, where he received 68.5% of the vote.  Fischer became the second mayor in Louisville's history to win a third term, and the first mayor to do so under the Consolidated city–county government.  He will be unable to run again in 2022 due to term limits set by the Kentucky General Assembly in 1986.  Fischer was sworn in for his final term on January 8, 2019.

Nominations
On May 22, 2018, the Democratic and Republican parties held their respective closed primary elections.  Approximately 95,000 votes were cast in both party primaries, though turnout for the Democratic primary was more than triple the Republican primary.  More than three-fourths of votes were cast in the Democratic primary.  Approximately 15.8% of Jefferson County's registered voters participated in 2018's mayoral primaries, which is slightly lower than the national turnout average of 19.6%.

Democratic Party

Primary
On March 24, 2017, during a speech to local nonprofit groups, incumbent mayor Greg Fischer became the first candidate to formally announce his campaign when he stated that he would seek a third term as Louisville's mayor.  Fisher remained uncontested  for the nomination until October 12, 2017, when Louisville Attorney Ryan Fenwick announced he was running to challenge Fischer in the 2018 Democratic Primary.  A member of Kentuckians for the Commonwealth, the 30-year-old Fenwick declared himself to be the most progressive candidate in the race.  Over the course of the primary, Fenwick ran an unapologetically left-wing campaign, prioritizing issues such as a $15 minimum wage, and criticizing the use of tax dollars for corporate developments.  According to Fenwick, his campaign was inspired by the successful primarying of Jackson, Mississippi mayor Tony Yarber by progressive attorney Chokwe Antar Lumumba.

With an incumbent mayor running for re-election against mostly token opposition, the race for the Democratic nomination was largely uneventful.  The nomination process consisted solely of the 2018 Democratic mayoral primary, held on May 22, 2018.  For the majority of the race, Fischer did not acknowledge his primary opponents in any of his public comments.  His only interaction with any other primary candidate was a single debate with candidate Ryan Fenwick, which took place on Monday, April 30, 2018.  Despite the presence of five total candidates, Fischer easily won his party's primary with over 75% of the vote.

Republican Party

Primary

Campaign

Endorsements

Results

Greg Fischer, the incumbent Democratic mayor of Louisville, defeated Republican nominee and former member of the Louisville Metro Council Angela Leet, tallying 61.3% of the vote to Leet's 36.5%, with the remainder of the vote going to various Independent candidates, most notably former professional football player Chris Thieneman, who received 0.4% of the vote.

References

Louisville mayoral
Louisville
Mayoral elections in Louisville, Kentucky
November 2018 events in the United States